In algebraic geometry, the Zeuthen–Segre invariant I is an invariant of a projective surface found in a complex projective space which was introduced by  and rediscovered by .

The invariant I is defined to be d – 4g – b if the surface has a pencil of curves, non-singular of genus g except for d curves with 1 ordinary node, and with b base points where the curves are non-singular and transverse. 

References

  Reprinted 2010 

Algebraic surfaces